Devilwater Creek, originally Arroyo Del Diablo, a stream with its source on the east slope of the Temblor Range in Kern County, California, that flows northeast to terminate just a mile west southwest of the mouth of Media Aqua Creek.  It was officially named Devilwater Creek in 1909.

History
Aguaje Del Diablo (Devil's Watering Place) was an aguaje or watering place on El Camino Viejo along the Arroyo del Diablo in the foothills on the east slope of the Temblor Range between Arroyo de Los Carneros in the south and Arroyo de Matarano to the north.

References

Rivers of Kern County, California
Temblor Range
El Camino Viejo